The Apostolic Nunciature to Uganda is an ecclesiastical office of the Catholic Church in Uganda. It is a diplomatic post of the Holy See, whose representative is called the Apostolic Nuncio with the rank of an ambassador.

List of papal representatives
Apostolic Pro-Nuncios
Amelio Poggi (5 August 1967 - 27 November 1969)
Luigi Bellotti (27 November 1969 - 2 September 1975)
Henri Lemaître (19 December 1975 - 16 November 1981)
Karl-Josef Rauber (18 December 1982 - 22 January 1990) 
Luis Robles Díaz (13 March 1990 - 6 March 1999)
Apostolic Nuncios 
Christophe Pierre (10 May 1999 - 22 March 2007) 
Paul Tschang In-Nam (27 August 2007 - 4 August 2012)
Michael August Blume (2 February 2013 - 4 July 2018)
Luigi Bianco (4 February 2019 - present)

References

 
Holy See
Uganda
Vatican City